Timothy James Shipman (born 13 May 1975) is a British journalist, who is a former political editor of the British newspaper The Sunday Times.

Shipman attended Queen Elizabeth's Grammar School, Horncastle in Lincolnshire, and studied History at Churchill College, Cambridge, graduating in 1996, where he was part of a losing Cuppers darts team, beaten by a Robinson team in the finals. He has been a national newspaper journalist since 1997, working initially for the Express stable of newspapers before being appointed as a political correspondent for the Daily Mail in 2005. He worked for the Sunday Telegraph as a Washington DC political correspondent, covering the 2008 United States elections and Barack Obama's campaign and subsequent victory. He has also previously written for the Daily Mail and the Sunday Express.

He is the author of All Out War (2016) about the EU referendum in 2016 and Fall Out (2017) about the 2017 UK general election. In 2017 he was awarded Press Journalist of the Year by the London Press Club.

In March 2019, Shipman reported an alleged coup in the Conservative Party to remove the Prime Minister, Theresa May from office.

In October 2021, he was succeeded as political editor by his deputy Caroline Wheeler.

Bibliography

References

1975 births
Living people
Alumni of Churchill College, Cambridge
British political commentators
The Sunday Times people
Daily Mail journalists